Eshmunazar may refer to:
Eshmunazar I
Eshmunazar II